Michelle Mills-Vorster (born 12 September 1978 in Windhoek, Namibia) is a Namibian cross-country cyclist. She is the first ever Namibian female to qualify for the Olympic Cross Country event and competed at the 2016 Summer Olympics in the women's cross country race. Vorster also qualified and competed in the 2018 Commonwealth Games in Gold Coast, Australia.  She competed in the Elite Road and Cross Country Olympic events.  She finished in 8th position in the Cross Country Olympic event, the highest position by any Namibian cyclist to date.

Vorster is also an African Continental Champion (2017) and multiple Namibian National Champion title holder in Mountain Bike Cross Country Olympic and Marathon cycling.

Major results

2015
 1st  Cross-country, National Mountain Bike Championships
 2nd  Team time trial, African Road Championships
 National Road Championships
2nd Road race
2nd Time trial
 3rd  Cross-country, African Mountain Bike Championships
 6th Time trial, African Games
2016
 1st  Cross-country, National Mountain Bike Championships
 2nd Road race, National Road Championships
 3rd  Cross-country, African Mountain Bike Championships
2017
 1st  Cross-country, African Mountain Bike Championships
 1st  Cross-country, National Mountain Bike Championships
2018
 1st  Cross-country, National Mountain Bike Championships
 2nd Road race, National Road Championships
 8th Cross-country, Commonwealth Games
2019
 1st  Cross-country, National Mountain Bike Championships
 National Road Championships
2nd Road race
2nd Time trial
2020
 1st  Cross-country, National Mountain Bike Championships

References

External links

1978 births
Living people
Sportspeople from Windhoek
White Namibian people
Namibian female cyclists
Olympic cyclists of Namibia
Cyclists at the 2016 Summer Olympics
Cyclists at the 2018 Commonwealth Games
Commonwealth Games competitors for Namibia
Competitors at the 2015 African Games
African Games competitors for Namibia
Cyclists at the 2020 Summer Olympics
20th-century Namibian women
21st-century Namibian women